Anthony Powell was a novelist.

Anthony or Tony Powell may also refer to:

Anthony Powell (designer) (1935–2021), English costume designer
Anthony J. Powell (born 1962), judge of the Kansas Court of Appeals
Tony Powell (footballer) (born 1947), former English football defender
Tony Powell, character in After the Fox